Drenje is a small settlement on the left bank of the Krka River in the Municipality of Dolenjske Toplice in Slovenia. The area is part of the historical region of Lower Carniola. The municipality is now included in the Southeast Slovenia Statistical Region. 

A late Bronze Age unfortified hill settlement has been identified on Plešivica Hill just north of the settlement.

References

External links
Drenje on Geopedia

Populated places in the Municipality of Dolenjske Toplice